Donga Mogudu is a 1987 Indian Telugu-language film starring Chiranjeevi, Bhanupriya, Madhavi and Raadhika. This film was directed by A. Kodandarami Reddy. Chiranjeevi portrayed a dual role in this film. The film is based on Yandamuri Veerendranath's novel Nallanchu Tellachira.

Plot
Ravi Teja (Chiranjeevi) is an industrialist who owns a textile company. He is a successful person in business, but his personal life lacks harmony and peace. Tortured by his wife (Madhavi) and her mother, he finds life miserable. He will slowly fall for his beautiful Personal Assistant Priyamvada (Bhanupriya). Meanwhile, his opponents cannot stand his success in business and plan to stop him from getting yet another business deal. Here, he meets Nagaraju (also Chiranjeevi), who is a small-time thief. Ravi Teja is saved by Nagaraju and he plans to exchange their positions, so that his problems can be solved forever. Nagaraju agrees, and teaches Madhavi, her mother, and Ravi Teja's enemies a lesson. Ravi Teja faces a strange situation of leading a thief's lifestyle. He encounters Seeta (Radhika), who is also a small-time thief. In the end, they both reveal their true identities and end the story on a happy note.

Cast
 Chiranjeevi as Ravi Teja and Nagaraju
 Bhanupriya as Priyamvada
 Radhika as Geetha
 Madhavi as Lalitha, Ravi Teja's wife
 Jayanthi
 Rao Gopal Rao
 Allu Rama Lingaiah
 Charan Raj
 Suthivelu
 Ranganath
 Master Suresh

Soundtrack 

Soundtrack composed by K. Chakravarthy was released through T-Series music label. Lyrics were written by Kosaraju, Rajasri and Sirivennela Seetharama Sastry.

References

External links
 
 Donga Mogudu at FilmiBeat.com

1987 films
Films directed by A. Kodandarami Reddy
Films scored by K. Chakravarthy
Films based on novels by Yandamuri Veerendranath
Films based on Indian novels
1980s Telugu-language films
Indian remakes of American films
Films shot in Jammu and Kashmir
Films shot in Telangana